McGeady is a surname. Notable people with the surname include:

Aiden McGeady (born 1986), professional footballer who currently plays for Everton and the Republic of Ireland internationally
John McGeady (born 1958), Scottish footballer
Mary Rose McGeady (1928–2012), American Roman Catholic nun and President of Covenant House from 1990 to 2003
Michael McGeady (born 1978), Irish golfer
Steven McGeady, former Intel executive best known as a witness in the Microsoft Antitrust Trial